Tan Sri Abdullah bin Ahmad (4 July 1937 – 12 June 2016) was a Malaysian journalist and politician from the United Malays National Organisation (UMNO). Alumni of Sultan Ismail College, Kota Bharu, Kelantan and at one time, he was the editor-in-chief of the New Straits Times.

He coined the concept of a "social contract" which justified his party's government bestowing special treatments and rights towards Malaysia's dominant Malay population despite given without any constitutional backing as claimed, during a speech in Singapore in 1989.

On 12 November 2003, he wrote an article criticising Saudi Arabian policies that aided the United States invasion of Iraq, among other things. As a result, the Saudi government reduced Malaysian quota for haj. On 21 November of the same year, he "was fired without warning by the daily's management at the request of the ruling UMNO party following a complaint by the Saudi ambassador in Malaysia." UMNO, which is part of the ruling government and holding equity in the papers later stated that he had jeopardised Malaysia's close relationship with Saudi Arabia. He had a contract that was supposed to expire in October 2004.

Ahmad died on 12 June 2016, after battling cancer. He was 79.

Honours
  :
 Commander of the Order of Loyalty to the Crown of Malaysia (PSM) - Tan Sri (1999)

References

1937 births
2016 deaths
Malaysian people of Malay descent
Malaysian journalists
Malaysian Muslims
United Malays National Organisation politicians
Members of the Dewan Rakyat
Commanders of the Order of Loyalty to the Crown of Malaysia